Paul Haarhuis and Jared Palmer were the defending champions, but chose not to participate that year.

Lleyton Hewitt and Sandon Stolle won in the final 6–2, 3–6, 6–3, against Jonas Björkman and Max Mirnyi.

Seeds

Draw

Finals

Top half

Bottom half

External links
Draw

Doubles